NGC 5300 is a face-on spiral galaxy in the constellation Virgo. It is a member of the NGC 5364 Group of galaxies, itself one of the Virgo III Groups strung out to the east of the Virgo Supercluster of galaxies.

References

External links

Intermediate spiral galaxies
Virgo (constellation)
08727
5300
48959